ChildVoice is a nonprofit organization dedicated to restoring the voices of children silenced by war.

Activities
ChildVoice operates through advocacy in developed countries, research on the effects of war on children, and projects to assist children in war-torn countries by providing education, housing, assistance with reintegration into civilian society, and religious instruction.  It currently operates one rehabilitation center for young child-mothers or other highly traumatized girls affected by the recent war in northern Uganda as well as South Sudan refugees fleeing the current active conflict in their home country.

History
ChildVoice was started in the fall of 2005 by a few professionals in New Hampshire who felt called to help child soldiers in Uganda in order to address the devastation that the Lord’s Resistance Army has brought upon Uganda for the last 20 years.

ChildVoice was represented at the Global Night Commute at the University of New Hampshire in Durham, and has been asked to be one of the partnering charities at Soul Festival 2006.

See also
Invisible Children
Military use of children
 List of anti-war organizations

External links
Official Website

Foreign charities operating in Uganda
Lord's Resistance Army
Invisible Children
Religious organizations established in 2005
Organizations for child soldiers
Organizations for children affected by war
Charities based in the United States
Child-related organisations in Uganda